is a passenger railway station located in the city of Ebina, Kanagawa, Japan and operated by the private railway operator Sagami Railway (Sotetsu). It is located near the border of Ebina with Zama and Ayase, and is convenient for many American servicemembers stationed at the Naval Air Facility Atsugi.

Lines

Station layout
The station consists of two side platforms connected to an elevated station building located above the platforms and tracks.

Platforms

Adjacent stations

History
Sagamino Station was opened on August 19, 1975. There was a short spur line which branched from the station to Atsugi base. While the track remains in place up to the fence of the base, the line is no longer in use.

Passenger statistics
In fiscal 2019, the station was used by an average of 37,399 passengers daily..

The passenger figures for previous years are as shown below.

Surrounding area
Sagamino Central Hospital

See also
 List of railway stations in Japan

References

External links

official home page.

Railway stations in Kanagawa Prefecture
Railway stations in Japan opened in 1975
Ebina, Kanagawa